Desmond Edmond Headland, Jr (born 21 January 1981) is an Australian rules footballer currently playing for Subiaco in the West Australian Football League, and a conservative political candidate. He plays as a half-forward flanker or midfielder. Headland was selected with the first overall draft pick in the 1998 AFL draft by the Brisbane Lions. He had a 166-game Australian Football League career, playing for Brisbane and Fremantle.

Playing career

Pre-AFL Career
Headland played junior football for Karrinyup Junior Football Club. His school football was for Lockridge Senior High School where he played alongside future Australian Football League players Garth Taylor, Brett Johnson and Dwayne Simpson. In 1997 Headland represented Western Australia (WA) at the under 16 national championships and won the best and fairest medal and was selected in the All-Australian team.  In 1998, he represented WA in the AFL Under-18 Championships, made his league debut for Subiaco Football Club and won both the West Australian Football League (WAFL) rising star and the Subiaco best and fairest award.  He also toured Ireland with the AFL/AIS Academy side.

At the end of this outstanding season, Headland was selected by Brisbane Lions with the first selection in the 1998 AFL draft.  He was featured along with Adam Ramanauskas and Brendan Fevola in an Australian Broadcasting Corporation television documentary called The Draft, which followed the three players in the months before they were all drafted to the AFL.

Brisbane career
Headland only played 3 games for Brisbane in 1999, making his debut in round 13 against Sydney, in which he scored 2 goals.  However, he only had 3 kicks in the following game and was dropped for the next five games until being recalled in round 20.  He starred in this game against his future team, kicking 3 goals in a huge win over Fremantle.  2000 saw Headland only play 2 games in the first half of the season, but he ended up playing 9 games, including both of Brisbane's final round games.  He wore guernsey number 19 in these first two seasons.

In 2001, Headland was given the number 1 guernsey when Richard Champion retired.  After playing the first game of the season, Headland was dropped for the next two games, before being recalled and playing the remaining 19 regular season games.  Poor form in the last few rounds saw him dropped for the finals series, and he missed the Brisbane Lions first premiership.  This enhanced speculation about his return to Perth, but following an outstanding display in the Lion's reserve premiership in the Queensland Australian Football League, he was retained for the 2002 season by Brisbane.

2002 started slowly for Headland, with his first game not until round 6, but the four goals he scored were an indication of what was to come.  He would play all remaining games that year, and in a 15-game purple patch from round 11 to the end of the year he would kick 30 goals, average 21 possessions and poll 16 Brownlow Medal votes, including three best-on-grounds and votes in six consecutive games.  This culminated in Brisbane's second premiership and, unlike 2001, Headland claimed a premiership medal.

Fremantle career
At the end of 2002, Fremantle entered the trade week with only one objective, to obtain Des Headland.  A complex trade including Blake Caracella, Adam McPhee and the exchanging of numerous draft picks saw Headland return to WA and join the team whose T-shirt he had worn during interviews at the 1998 draft camp (as shown in the documentary The Draft). The expectations of the Fremantle fans were high, especially when McPhee, who was traded by Fremantle to obtain Headland, won All-Australian selection and the Bomber's best and fairest award, the Crichton Medal in 2004.

In the lead up to the 2003 AFL season Headland was chosen in an ATSIC Chairman's All-Star team that played Carlton at Marrara Oval, Darwin. The All-Star team defeated Carlton by 73 points, with Headland adjudged by The Age as best on ground.

2003 saw Headland poll Brownlow Medal votes in four games, including two best on ground performances.  However, he failed to register a top-ten finish in the club best and fairest award.  Leg injuries including an ankle injury during the Wizard Cup in 2004 and a calf strain in 2005 have limited his effectiveness, and he has not been able to recapture the form that he showed at Brisbane in 2002 for any sustained period of time.

In Round 4, 2003, Headland was one of 7 indigenous players to represent Fremantle, the most ever to play in a single AFL team.  The other indigenous players for Fremantle that day were Troy Cook, Jeff Farmer, Antoni Grover, Roger Hayden, Steven Koops and Dion Woods.  This game also saw Fremantle score its highest ever score of 25.17 167 in a comprehensive defeat of the Kangaroos.

In Round 8, 2003 in a match between St Kilda and Fremantle, Headland was one of four players who had been number one AFL draft selections and one of twenty-first round selections.

Statistics

|-
|- style="background-color: #EAEAEA"
! scope="row" style="text-align:center" | 1999
|style="text-align:center;"|
| 19 || 3 || 5 || 1 || 19 || 10 || 29 || 9 || 1 || 1.7 || 0.3 || 6.3 || 3.3 || 9.7 || 3.0 || 0.3
|-
! scope="row" style="text-align:center" | 2000
|style="text-align:center;"|
| 19 || 9 || 2 || 6 || 48 || 24 || 72 || 22 || 16 || 0.2 || 0.7 || 5.3 || 2.7 || 8.0 || 2.4 || 1.8
|- style="background-color: #EAEAEA"
! scope="row" style="text-align:center" | 2001
|style="text-align:center;"|
| 1 || 20 || 11 || 15 || 147 || 51 || 198 || 52 || 38 || 0.6 || 0.8 || 7.4 || 2.6 || 9.9 || 2.6 || 1.9
|-
! scope="row" style="text-align:center;" | 2002
|style="text-align:center;"|
| 1 || 20 || 34 || 24 || 293 || 95 || 388 || 139 || 54 || 1.7 || 1.2 || 14.7 || 4.8 || 19.4 || 7.0 || 2.7
|- style="background-color: #EAEAEA"
! scope="row" style="text-align:center" | 2003
|style="text-align:center;"|
| 11 || 22 || 18 || 19 || 259 || 89 || 348 || 94 || 58 || 0.8 || 0.9 || 11.8 || 4.0 || 15.8 || 4.3 || 2.6
|-
! scope="row" style="text-align:center" | 2004
|style="text-align:center;"|
| 11 || 20 || 17 || 9 || 232 || 105 || 337 || 77 || 73 || 0.9 || 0.5 || 11.6 || 5.3 || 16.9 || 3.9 || 3.7
|- style="background-color: #EAEAEA"
! scope="row" style="text-align:center" | 2005
|style="text-align:center;"|
| 11 || 15 || 20 || 17 || 166 || 61 || 227 || 74 || 40 || 1.3 || 1.1 || 11.1 || 4.1 || 15.1 || 4.9 || 2.7
|-
! scope="row" style="text-align:center" | 2006
|style="text-align:center;"|
| 11 || 20 || 21 || 12 || 259 || 74 || 333 || 104 || 41 || 1.1 || 0.6 || 13.0 || 3.7 || 16.7 || 5.2 || 2.1
|- style="background-color: #EAEAEA"
! scope="row" style="text-align:center" | 2007
|style="text-align:center;"|
| 11 || 17 || 25 || 15 || 213 || 88 || 301 || 73 || 34 || 1.5 || 0.9 || 12.5 || 5.2 || 17.7 || 4.3 || 2.0
|-
! scope="row" style="text-align:center" | 2008
|style="text-align:center;"|
| 11 || 6 || 4 || 4 || 55 || 30 || 85 || 19 || 16 || 0.7 || 0.7 || 9.2 || 5.0 || 14.2 || 3.2 || 2.7
|- style="background-color: #EAEAEA"
! scope="row" style="text-align:center" | 2009
|style="text-align:center;"|
| 11 || 9 || 13 || 8 || 99 || 38 || 137 || 57 || 26 || 1.4 || 0.9 || 11.0 || 4.2 || 15.2 || 6.3 || 0.9
|-
! scope="row" style="text-align:center" | 2010
|style="text-align:center;"|
| 11 || 5 || 7 || 2 || 35 || 12 || 47 || 16 || 8 || 1.4 || 0.4 || 7.0 || 2.4 || 9.4 || 3.2 || 1.6
|- class="sortbottom"
! colspan=3| Career
! 166
! 177
! 132
! 1825
! 677
! 2502
! 736
! 405
! 1.1
! 0.8
! 11.0
! 4.1
! 15.1
! 4.4
! 2.4
|}

Return to Subiaco
After retiring from Fremantle in 2010. Headland rejoined his former WAFL team Subiaco for the 2011 WAFL season.

Controversies
On 14 April 2007, Headland was involved in an altercation with West Coast Eagles player Adam Selwood. Both appeared before the AFL Tribunal on 18 April. Headland was charged with two counts of striking Selwood, and one count of wrestling with him, while Selwood was charged with using insulting language towards Headland. On 18 April, the tribunal found Selwood not guilty of using insulting language. It found Headland guilty of two of the three charges but elected not to impose a penalty.

Headland returned to the field the following week to be one of the best players for Fremantle against Melbourne, kicking 3 goals and collecting 29 disposals.

In late June 2007, Headland was involved in a fight in Northbridge with a relative, only weeks after teammates Chris Tarrant and Jeff Farmer were suspended by Fremantle for being involved in other nightclub brawls.  Headland was not sanctioned by the club.

Political career

Headland was selected in July 2013 as a candidate for the Palmer United Party for the Federal seat of Durack. This is a conservative party formed by Australian mining businessman Clive Palmer in April 2013.

Headland announced his candidacy only one day after he had told a West Australian paper that "I've had one conversation which has sparked a bit of interest... I haven't had a big think about it or spoken to my family. There's nothing set in stone or anything yet, but who knows. I'm only a 32-year-old and still learning my way and it was just a quick phone call to say G'day."

References

External links

1981 births
Living people
Fremantle Football Club players
Brisbane Lions players
Brisbane Lions Premiership players
Subiaco Football Club players
United Australia Party (2013) politicians
Indigenous Australian players of Australian rules football
Australian rules footballers from Western Australia
Southern Districts Football Club players
South Fremantle Football Club players
Peel Thunder Football Club players
One-time VFL/AFL Premiership players